During the 2007–08 English football season, AFC Bournemouth competed in Football League One.

Season summary
Bournemouth struggled all season amidst an injury crisis, and when they were docked ten points by the Football League after entering administration, with debts around £4 million, on 8 February, relegation appeared to be almost certain. The only bid that administrators Gerald Krasner and Begbies Traynor accepted came from a consortium led by chairman Jeff Mostyn. However, in a press conference on 3 April, Krasner said that, due to a breach of the agreement between the administrators and the consortium relating to the funding of the consortium and the sale of the club, the agreement broke down. Krasner also warned that the club might also be closed before the end of the season, unless appropriate funding came forward.

In spite of off-the-field issues with the club, Bournemouth achieved a remarkable string of results in League One. By 19 April, a winning streak of five matches left Bournemouth four points away from safety with two games remaining. The winning streak was increased to six matches on 26 April with a vital 1–0 victory over Crewe Alexandra. Victory or a draw away at Carlisle United on 3 May, depending on Cheltenham Town and Gillingham's results, would ensure Bournemouth's survival in the division. Former manager Harry Redknapp commented that escaping relegation "would be more than a great escape, it would be a miracle" and added that "if Kevin (Bond) doesn't get Manager of the Month there's something wrong". Bournemouth managed to achieve a 1–1 draw in the match against Carlisle United but, with Cheltenham Town winning 2–1 at home to Doncaster Rovers, were relegated to League Two.

Had Bournemouth not been given a points deduction as a result of entering administration, the club would have finished in 15th, at the expense of Crewe, who would have been relegated in their place.

Results

Bournemouth's score comes first

Legend

Football League One

FA Cup

Football League Cup

Football League Trophy

Squad
Squad at end of season

Left club during season

References

AFC Bournemouth seasons
AFC Bournemouth